The Iron-Fisted Monk (Chinese: 三德和尚与舂米六) is a 1977 Hong Kong martial arts film starring and directed by Sammo Hung in his directorial debut, who also wrote the screenplay with Huang Feng and Yu Ting. The film co-stars Chan Sing, Fung Hark-On and Lo Hoi-pang. The film was released on 25 August 1977.

Plot
Hawker (Sammo Hung) is sent to the Shaolin temple by the Iron Fisted Monk (Chan Sing), after he saves Hawker from a beating by the Manchus. After being trained by his master (James Tien) he runs away from the temple, only to be confronted by his master and forced to take the four tests. Whilst this is happening, an official (Fung Hak-on) is indulging in his passion for raping women, and is virtually above the law as he is a powerful Manchu officer. He begins by raping Liang's (Lo Hoi-pang) sister (Chu Ching), who then commits suicide and makes Liang a very angry man. Liang takes his revenge by killing one of those pesky Manchus but everyone thinks Hawker is responsible.

Both Liang and Hawker go to meet the Iron Fisted Monk who convinces Hawker to teach all the workers at the dye factory kung fu, so they can defend themselves against the Manchus. The final act involves the Manchus' butchering of the workers from the dye factory, kill Liang's wife and Liang's mother (Liang's wife was raped before being killed). When Liang eventually dies from his wounds, both Hawker and the Iron Fisted Monk swear vengeance on the Manchus and it is delivered.

Cast
 Sammo Hung as Hawker
 Chan Sing as Monk Sam Tak (The Iron Fisted Monk)
 Fung Hark-On as Official
 Lo Hoi-pang as Liang
 Chu Ching as Liang's sister
 Chu Ching as Ah Chen, Liang's wife
 Wang Hsieh as Rapist's boss
 Dean Shek as Manchu
 James Tien as Hawker's instructor (cameo)
 Wu Ma as Miss Chuen's client (cameo)
 Lam Ching-ying as Shu-liu worker
 Casanova Wong as Shaolin disciple
 Eric Tsang as Shu-liu worker
 Chung Fat as Shu-liu worker
 Fung Fung as Brother worker
 Mars as Shu-liu worker
 Lai Man as Liang's mother

(*) Note: There are two different actresses named Chu Ching in the film. One portrays Liang's wife and the other portrays Liang's sister.

Release
The film grossed HK$2,283,594.40 during its 15-week theatrical run.  It was released on DVD on 29 October 2001 in the UK and 7 September 2004 in the US.

The Hong Kong version of the film contains a longer version of the rape of Liang's wife than the American release.

Reception
Almar Haflidason of BBC Online rated it 4/5 stars and recommended it to Sammo Hung fans.  J. Doyle Wallis of DVD Talk rated it 3.5/5 stars and wrote, "Iron-Fisted Monk moves briskly with some solid fights and a decent story."  David Johnson of DVD Verdict wrote, "A lackadaisical start gives way to a relentless hand-to-hand spectacle of zaniness."

See also
 Lists of Hong Kong films
 Sammo Hung filmography

References

External links
 
 

1977 films
1977 directorial debut films
1977 martial arts films
1970s martial arts comedy films
1970s Cantonese-language films
Films directed by Sammo Hung
Golden Harvest films
Hong Kong martial arts comedy films
Kung fu films
1970s Hong Kong films